The 1976 Campeonato Paulista da Divisão Especial de Futebol Profissional was the 75th season of São Paulo's top professional football league. Palmeiras won the championship by the 18th time. no teams were relegated.

Championship
The championship was divided into two rounds; in the first, the eighteen teams of the championship were divided into three groups of six teams, with each team playing once against all other teams, and the four best teams of each group passing to the Second round. The team with the most points in the first phase regardless of group would gain a bonus point for the Second round. In the second round, the remaining twelve teams would all play against each other once, and the team with the most points would be champion. Although no teams were relegated from last year's championship, Saad, which had been invited into the last two championships, wasn't invited back into the championship for 1976.

First round

Group A

Group B

Group C

Second round

References

Campeonato Paulista seasons
Paulista